Ricardo Benjamín Salinas Pliego (born 19 October 1955) is a Mexican businessman, founder and chairman of Grupo Salinas, a corporate conglomerate with interests in telecommunications, media, financial services, and retail.

He is the third richest person in Mexico and the 172nd richest person in the world with an estimated net worth of US$13.6 billion in February 2021.

Career
Ricardo Salinas Pliego is a CPA graduate of the Instituto Tecnológico y de Estudios Superiores de Monterrey (ITESM). After earning an MBA at Tulane University, he joined Elektra in 1981 as import manager. He learned the business moves when the company faced dire financial straits at the continuing devaluation of the eighties. Between 1981 and 1986, Salinas experimented with other businesses such as a restaurant in Monterrey, satellite dishes and the sale of systems multi communication.

In 1987 Ricardo succeeded his father Hugo Salinas Price as CEO of Grupo Elektra. The company began as a family-owned furniture manufacturing company called Salinas & Rocha founded in 1906 by Salinas' great-grandfather, Benjamin Salinas. In 1950, Hugo Salinas Rocha created Grupo Elektra and when Ricardo Salinas became CEO of the company in 1987 he refocused Elektra on basic products: appliances, electronics, and furniture. Significantly, he developed at Elektra a vast new consumer market among Mexico's lower middle income consumers by providing credit sales and diverse financial products and services.

Grupo Elektra expanded further and became Mexico's biggest consumer-finance company when, in 2002, it won the first banking license granted to any Mexican institution in nearly a decade. The strategy was to build new markets by creating new buying power among classes of people largely ignored by most other major Mexican businesses. Thus was born Banco Azteca, which currently has operations in Mexico, Panama, Guatemala and Honduras. Subsequently, Grupo Elektra obtained two financial licenses from the federal government to create Seguros Azteca and Afore Azteca.

Salinas is also chairman of TV Azteca, one of the world's two largest producers of Spanish-language television programming. Under his leadership, TV Azteca broke Mexico's long-standing television monopoly through the successful privatization of a media package offered by the government.

In 2001, TV Azteca launched Azteca America, a wholly owned Spanish-language broadcasting network aimed at the 50 million-strong Hispanic population of the United States. Azteca America had affiliates in 70 markets, including Los Angeles, New York City, Chicago, Miami and Houston, reaching 89 percent of the Hispanic population in the U.S. Azteca America was sold to HC2 Holdings in 2017.

In 2003, Salinas bought Iusacell (the first cell phone company in Mexico) and four years later, merged it with Unefon, another cell phone company, founded by him in 1999. However, in early 2015, Grupo Salinas announced the sale of Iusacell to AT&T Today, with Totalplay, offers the most innovative internet and television services and telephony via fiber optics to home. Also, Totalplay Empresarial provides broadband internet access video surveillance, broadband interfaces, videoconferencing, among other services to institutions and companies throughout Mexico.

In 2012, Grupo Elektra acquired Advance America, —currently Purpose Financial—, a company that provides short-term non- bank loans in the United States. Also put into operation Punto Casa de Bolsa. The Group operates more than six thousand points of contact in Mexico, United States, Guatemala, Honduras, Peru and Panama.

Salinas has participated and addressed The World Economic Forum, The Economist Roundtable on Mexico, the Young Presidents' Organization, UCLA, the Institute of the Americas, Harvard Business School and TED, where he discussed issues related to globalization, education, entrepreneurship, freedom and opportunity in the BOP. He also has a blog where he publishes his business, political, economic and cultural ideas. His articles have been published in The New York Times, The Boston Globe, The Hill, Newsweek in Spanish, La Opinión, and regularly writes in the Mexican press. Mr. Salinas was the first Mexican to elect the Board of Trustees of the Aspen Institute.

It was announced in 2020 that Salinas had 10% of his liquid portfolio invested in Bitcoin.

Philanthropy
Salinas formed the nonprofit Fundación Azteca in 1997 to address a broad range of social problems with ongoing campaigns in healthcare and nutrition, education, and the protection of the environment. It is a foundation that finances and supports other foundations. Fundación Azteca has raised millions of dollars, benefiting hundreds of thousands of lives.

In April 2021, the Ricardo B. Salinas Pliego Center was inaugurated, a space that seeks to promote the development of ideas that contribute to the transformation of Mexico, based on six lines of action: Freedom, Rule of Law, Education, Leadership, Art and Culture, and Innovation and Entrepreneurship. The initiative is made up of the following programs: Arte & Cultura, through which artistic and cultural activities are promoted to raise the quality of life of society; Caminos de la Libertad, a space for reflection on different aspects of freedom that seeks to raise awareness of its value and Kybernus, which promotes the formation of young leaders from the local level.

Controversies
Salinas has been involved in a series of political and financial scandals (which include investigations by the American Securities and Exchange Commission and the Mexican Comisión Nacional Bancaria y de Valores), and has been linked to ex-President Carlos Salinas de Gortari.  Salinas was charged by the American Securities and Exchange Commission in January 2005 with being engaged in an elaborate scheme to conceal Salinas's role in a series of transactions through which he personally profited by $109 million. The SEC complaint also alleged that Salinas and Padilla sold millions of dollars of TV Azteca stock while Salinas's self-dealing remained undisclosed to the market place.  This was settled in September 2006 with Salinas required to pay $7.5M while not admitting guilt. As part of the settlement, Salinas was forbidden for five years to serve as officer or director of any United States publicly listed company. Esteban Moctezuma (ex-Secretary of Interior of PRI President Ernesto Zedillo), was appointed as Chief Executive Officer of Fundación Azteca in 2002 by Salinas Pliego. His daughter, Ninfa, entered to the PVEM party (linked to the PRI party, some old but now of recent political endeavor) in 2009.

Football game and presidential debate

Salinas decided to air the 2011–12 quarter final game between Tigres de la UANL and Monarcas Morelia, two professional football teams from the Mexican Primera División, during the same time as the presidential debate of the 2012 Mexican general elections. The day of these two events were set for 6 May 2012.

He posted on Twitter the following message on 30 April 2012:

Emilio Azcárraga Jean, the CEO of Televisa, posted a message on Twitter to "clarify the doubts" by stating that it was not Televisa who was planning to air the game between Tigres and Morelia, but rather TV Azteca, the closest television competitor to his company.

The Federal Electoral Institute (IFE) and its president, Leonardo Valdés Zurita, asked for TV Azteca to not air the game at the same time as the presidential debate. According to Zurita, the IFE has already set up the permissions and invitations to carry out the debate, but also recognized that other media companies can air programs they consider relevant. In addition, the electoral councils in Mexico recognized that this incident will leave the Mexican people with two difficult dilemmas: "watch football or the presidential debate between Josefina Vázquez Mota (PAN), Enrique Peña Nieto (PRI), Andrés Manuel López Obrador (PRD) and Gabriel Quadri de la Torre (PANAL)." Nonetheless, the majority of the messages posted on Twitter criticized Salinas Pliego for this incident.

Anonymous group and Grupo Salinas
Following the decision of Salinas, the internet group Anonymous "attacked" the official website of Grupo Salinas on 1 May 2012, posting on Twitter that they wanted the presidential debate and not the football game. The official webpage—www.gruposalinas.com—was not available for some time.

TV Azteca accepts to air debate
On 3 May 2012, the IFE acknowledged that TV Azteca decided to air the presidential debate on XHTVM-TV, commonly referred to as Proyecto 40. On his defense, Salinas said on 4 May 2012 that the "majority of the population is not interested in the presidential debate." He claimed that only 15% of the population is interested in the debate, while 54% of them claim they are not interested at all. If the statistics were different, he said, then he would have adjusted his strategy. Salinas then said that his business "understands well" the preferences of the population and takes decisions accordingly.

Companies
 Grupo Salinas.

 Retail and Financial Services
 Grupo Elektra.
 Purpose Financial.
 Punto Casa de Bolsa.
 Banco Azteca.
 Seguros Azteca.
 Afore Azteca.
 Tiendas Neto.

 Media
 TV Azteca.
 Azteca Guatemala.
 Azteca Honduras.

 Telecommunications
 Totalplay.
 Totalplay Empresarial.

 Motorcycles
 Italika.

 Other Companies
 Upax.
 Agencia i.
 Promo Espacio.
 Grupo Dragón.
 Totalsec.

 Social Value
 Fundación Azteca.
 Centro Ricardo B. Salinas Pliego.
 Kybernus.
 Arte y Cultura Grupo Salinas.

 Soccer
 Mazatlán F.C.

See also
 List of Mexican billionaires
 List of people named in the Panama Papers

References

External links

Official website
Forbes: Salinas Pliego & Family
Revista Poder: Ricardo Salinas Pliego (in Spanish)

1955 births
Mexican football chairmen and investors
Businesspeople from Mexico City
Mexican billionaires
Mexican company founders
Mexican mass media owners
Mexican people of American descent
Monterrey Institute of Technology and Higher Education alumni
Tulane University alumni
Freeman School of Business alumni
Living people
People named in the Panama Papers
Mexican television executives
TV Azteca people
People named in the Paradise Papers